Sebastian Cosmin Cozmâncă (born February 2, 1992) is a Romanian Muay Thai kickboxer who competes in the heavyweight division. He is currently signed to the Dynamite Fighting Show. He formerly competed in the Superkombat Fighting Championship and the Colosseum Tournament.  He was Cătălin Moroșanu's teammate and training partner.

In October 2022, Cozmâncă was ranked the #8 light-heavyweight kickboxer in the world by Beyond Kick. He was removed from the rankings by moving to the heavyweight division.

Championships and awards

Kickboxing
Dynamite Fighting Show
2018 DFS Heavyweight Championship (one time) 
Colosseum Tournament
2018 Colosseum Tournament World -95 kg/209 lb Championship (one time) 
GP Tracia
2016 GP Tracia -95 kg/209 lb Championship (one time) 
World Muay Thai Federation 
2016 WMF European Championships Heavyweight Gold Medalist

Professional kickboxing career
In 2015, Cozmâncă was signed by the Romanian Superkombat Fighting Championship promotion. In 2018, he won the Colosseum Tournament World -95 kg/209 lb Championship, holding title before vacating it to sign with Dynamite Fighting Show. In the same year, at Dynamite Fighting Show 2, he defeated Valentin Bordianu for the Dynamite Fighting Show Heavyweight Championship via second-round knockout.

Kickboxing record

|-
|-  bgcolor="#CCFFCC" 
| 2023-03-12 || Win ||align=left| Ilie Brancu || Dynamite Fighting Show 18 - Heavyweight Championship Tournament, Quarter Finals || Timișoara, Romania || TKO (three knockdowns/low kicks) || 1 || 2:58 || 21-4
|-
|-  style="background:#fbb;"
| 2022-12-08 || Loss||align=left| Colin George || Dynamite Fighting Show 17 || Constanța, Romania || Decision (unanimous) || 3 || 3:00 || 20-4 
|-
|-  bgcolor="#CCFFCC"
| 2022-10-19 || Win ||align=left| Bruno Susano || Dynamite Fighting Show 16 || Iași, Romania || Decision (unanimous) || 3 || 3:00 || 20-3 
|-
|-  bgcolor="#CCFFCC"
| 2022-06-24 || Win ||align=left| Freddy Kemayo || Dynamite Fighting Show 15 || Buzău, Romania || Decision (unanimous) || 3 || 3:00 || 19-3 
|-
|-  bgcolor="#CCFFCC"
| 2020-10-23 || Win ||align=left| Anthony Burger  || Colosseum Tournament 20 || Arad, Romania || TKO (towel thrown) || 1 || 1:40 || 18-3
|-
|-  bgcolor="#CCFFCC"
| 2019-07-20 || Win ||align=left| Tarik Cherkaoui  || Colosseum Tournament 14 || Fălticeni, Romania || KO (right hook) || 1 || 2:05 || 17-3
|-
|-  bgcolor="#CCFFCC"
| 2019-05-09 || Win ||align=left| Badr Ferdous || Colosseum Tournament 12  || Arad, Romania || TKO (retirement) || 2 || 3:00 || 16-3
|-
|-  bgcolor="#CCFFCC"
| 2018-11-17 || Win ||align=left| Yuri Gorbenko || Mix Kombat 4 || Bistrița, Romania || KO (left hook) || 1 || 0:55 || 15-3
|-
|-  bgcolor="#CCFFCC"
| 2018-10-19 || Win ||align=left| Valentin Bordianu || Dynamite Fighting Show 2 || Piatra Neamț, Romania || KO (right hook) || 2 || 2:17 || 14-3
|-
! style=background:white colspan=9 |
|-
|-  bgcolor="#CCFFCC"
| 2018-07-05 || Win ||align=left| Gordon Haupt || Dynamite Fighting Show 1 || Bucharest, Romania || KO (right high kick) || 1 || 1:34 || 13-3 
|-
|-  bgcolor="#CCFFCC"
| 2018-05-24 || Win ||align=left| Marius Munteanu || Colosseum Tournament 7 || Bucharest, Romania || TKO (towel thrown) || 2 || 2:19 || 12-3 
|-
|-  bgcolor="#CCFFCC"
| 2018-04-20 || Win ||align=left| Frederik Kretschmer || Colosseum Tournament 6 || Iași, Romania || KO (right high kick) || 1 || 2:57 || 11-3 
|-
! style=background:white colspan=9 |
|-
|-  bgcolor="#CCFFCC"
| 2018-02-23 || Win ||align=left| Dustin Stoltzfus || Colosseum Tournament 5 || Galați, Romania || KO (left hook) || 1 || 1:26 || 10-3 
|-
|-  bgcolor="#CCFFCC"
| 2017-10-16 || Win ||align=left| Nicolai Garbuz || Colosseum Tournament 4 || Bucharest, Romania || KO (left hook) || 1 || 1:23 || 9-3 
|-
|-  bgcolor="#CCFFCC"
| 2017-03-12 || Win ||align=left| Simon Ogolla || SUPERKOMBAT New Heroes 10 || Bucharest, Romania || Decision (unanimous) || 3 || 3:00 || 8-3 
|-
|-  bgcolor="#CCFFCC"
| 2016-11-12 || Win ||align=left| Damian García || Superkombat World Grand Prix || Bucharest, Romania || KO (right hook) || 1 || 1:05 || 7-3 
|-
|-  bgcolor="#CCFFCC"
| 2016-10-01 || Win ||align=left| David Trallero || Superkombat World Grand Prix || Iași, Romania || Decision (unanimous) || 3 || 3:00 || 6-3 
|-
|-  style="background:#fbb;"
| 2016-07-30 || Loss ||align=left| Murat Aygün || Superkombat World Grand Prix || Mamaia, Romania || Extra round decision (unanimous) || 4 || 3:00 || 5-3  
|-
|-  style="background:#fbb;"
| 2016-05-07 || Loss ||align=left| Clyde Brunswijk || Superkombat World Grand Prix || Bucharest, Romania || Decision (split) || 3 || 3:00 || 5-2  
|-
|-  bgcolor="#CCFFCC"
| 2016-03-20 || Win ||align=left| Ilie Brancu || GP Tracia 33 || Cluj-Napoca, Romania || Decision || 3 || 3:00 || 5-1 
|-
! style=background:white colspan=9 |
|-
|-  bgcolor="#CCFFCC"
| 2016-02-19 || Win ||align=left| Tomislav Čikotić || Final Fight Championship 22 || Athens, Greece || Decision (split) || 3 || 3:00 || 4-1 
|-
|-  bgcolor="#CCFFCC"
| 2015-11-07 || Win ||align=left| Cosmin Ionescu || Superkombat World Grand Prix 2015 Final || Bucharest, Romania || KO (left high kick) || 1 || N/A || 3-1 
|-
|-  bgcolor="#CCFFCC"
| 2015-10-16 || Win ||align=left| Cosmin Joltea || ACB KB 3: Grand Prix Final || Sibiu, Romania || Decision (unanimous) || 3 || 3:00 || 2-1 
|-
|-  style="background:#fbb;"
| 2014-12-20 || Loss ||align=left| Pavel Voronin || KOK World GP 2014 in Chișinău || Chișinău, Moldova || Decision (unanimous) || 3 || 3:00 || 1-1 
|-
|-
| colspan=9 | Legend:

References

External links  
 Official Dynamite Fighting Show profile 
 Profile from Final Fight Championship

1992 births 
Living people
People from Dorohoi
Romanian Muay Thai practitioners
Romanian male kickboxers  
Cruiserweight kickboxers
Heavyweight kickboxers
SUPERKOMBAT kickboxers
Eastern Orthodox Christians from Romania